The participation of the Peruvian football clubs in official international tournaments in the competitions organized by the CONMEBOL began in 1948 with the participation of the Deportivo Municipal in the Campeonato Sudamericano de Campeones, trophy recognized in 1996 as the first cup organized by the CONMEBOL. After this contest, the dispute of the official international tournaments was interrupted until 1960, when the South American teams began to participate in the Copa Libertadores.

Universitario is the Peruvian club that more international cups disputed, with 46 participations, followed by Sporting Cristal (45), Alianza Lima (37), Melgar (13), Cienciano (11), Sport Huancayo (9), Juan Aurich (8), Sport Boys (8) and Universidad César Vallejo (7).

Defunct tournaments

Campeonato Sudamericano de Campeones (1948) 
The Copa de Campeones was a football competition played in 1948. It was played between 11 February and 17 March by clubs from Argentina, Bolivia, Brazil, Chile, Ecuador, Peru, and Uruguay.

Recopa Sudamericana de Clubes (1970–1971)
The Copa Ganadores de Copa, also known as Recopa Sudamericana de Clubes, was a now defunct official South American football tournament organized by CONMEBOL. Its first edition was held in 1970 and was won by Bolivian club Mariscal Santa Cruz. The second edition was organized in 1971, however, Group One matches have never been played and the tournament reduced to a friendly competition at the end and the winner of Group Two was crowned the champion. The competition was not held after this year.

Copa CONMEBOL (1992–1999)
The Copa CONMEBOL (CONMEBOL Cup) was an annual football tournament played between 1992 and 1999. It was the South American equivalent of the European UEFA Cup. It replaced the Supercopa Sudamericana which featured past Copa Libertadores champions. Teams that were not able to qualify for the Copa Libertadores played in this tournament. The tournament was played as a knockout cup. Six of the eight editions were played with sixteen teams whilst one was played with eighteen, featuring a preliminary round, and another with fourteen teams.

Copa Merconorte (1998–2001)
The Copa Merconorte was an international football competition played from 1998 to 2001 by clubs from Venezuela, Colombia, Ecuador, Peru, Bolivia, and later the United States, Costa Rica and Mexico.  The name was a counterpart to the Copa Mercosur, which was based on the actual Mercosur economic pact between Brazil, Argentina, Paraguay, Uruguay and Chile (no Merconorte trade bloc actually exists). It was superseded by the Copa Sudamericana in 2002.

Current Tournaments

Copa Libertadores de América (1960–) 
The Copa Libertadores de América, officially the Copa Santander Libertadores de América for sponsorship reasons, is an annual international club football competition organized by CONMEBOL since 1960. It is the most prestigious club competition in South American football. Despite being a South American competition, Mexican teams have been invited since 1998. The name of the tournament is an homage to the Libertadores (Portuguese and Spanish for freedom fighters), the main leaders of the independence wars of South America.

Recopa Sudamericana (1989–)
The Recopa Sudamericana (South American Winners' Cup, Recopa, or Cup Winners' Cup) is an annual football match-up between the reigning champions of the previous year's Copa Libertadores and the Copa Sudamericana. It is analogous to its European counterpart, the UEFA Super Cup.

Copa Sudamericana (2002–)
The Copa Sudamericana, officially Copa Sudamericana de Clubes, also known as Copa Nissan Sudamericana for sponsorship reasons, is an annual international club football competition organized by CONMEBOL since 2002. It is the second most important competition in South American club football. Despite being an organized by CONMEBOL, they invited Mexican teams between 2005 and 2008. It can be said that the Copa Sudamericana is an equivalent of sorts to the now-defunct Copa Conmebol.

Total International Participations by club

References

External links
 Peruvian Clubs in Copa Libertadores
 Peruvian Clubs in Copa Conmebol
 Peruvian Clubs in Copa Sudamericana

Football in Peru
Peruvian Primera División
Peruvian football clubs records and statistics
South American football clubs in international competitions